Michael A. "Mike" Minihan (born 1967) is a general in the United States Air Force who has served as the commander of Air Mobility Command since October 5, 2021.

Career 
Minihan was commissioned in 1990 through Air Force ROTC at Auburn University in Alabama, where he had earned a Bachelor of Science in economics the year prior. He began his service in the Air Force as a Lockheed C-130 Hercules pilot.

From 2013 onwards, Minihan held multiple key roles in the Pacific. He served as the deputy commander of United States Indo-Pacific Command from September 2019 to August 2021. He previously served as its chief of staff from January 2019 to September 2019.

In July 2021, he was nominated and confirmed for promotion to general and assignment as the commander of Air Mobility Command, set to succeed Gen. Jacqueline Van Ovost, who has been nominated to head United States Transportation Command.

In September 2022, Minihan said at a military conference that the Air Force was responsible for the biggest "pile of our nation's enemy dead" among the branches of the American military and that "[w]hen you can kill your enemy, every part of your life is better. Your food tastes better. Your marriage is stronger."

In January 2023, Minihan issued a memo predicting that China would invade Taiwan in 2025 using the 2024 presidential elections in Taiwan and the United States as an excuse and a distraction respectively. He also suggested that subordinates should prepare for war with more aggressive training and in respect to their personal affairs. Minihan's memo also asked airmen with weapons qualifications to empty clips into shooting targets while aiming for the head, saying that "unrepentant lethality matters most". Minihan's memo stated that all commanders within the Air Mobility Command must report acknowledgement of the memo in preparation for "the China fight". His Commander's Intent stated, "Go faster. Drive readiness, integration, and agility for ourselves and the Joint Force to deter, and if required, defeat China. This is the first of 8 monthly directives from me. You need to know I alone own the pen on these orders. My expectations are high, and these orders are not up for negotiation. Follow them. I will be tough, fair, and loving in my approach to secure victory". An official at the United States Department of Defense later told NBC News that Minihan's memo was "not representative of the department's view on China."

Awards and decorations

General Minihan is also a recipient of the Order of Saint Maurice.

Effective dates of promotions

References

1967 births
Living people
Recipients of the Defense Distinguished Service Medal
Recipients of the Defense Superior Service Medal
Recipients of the Legion of Merit
United States Air Force personnel of the Iraq War
United States Air Force generals